Jerson Vanencio Monteiro (born April 28, 1985 in Luanda, Angola) is a professional soccer player. At the age of 14 he left his native country to attend school in the United States. He graduated from Robert E Lee high school in Houston, Texas. He currently is unsigned.

He has obtained a United States green card so he will count as a domestic player according to MLS rules.

Career
Jerson played varsity soccer for the Blazers at the University of Alabama at Birmingham from 2003 - 2006. Monteiro, a National Soccer Coaches Association of America (NSCAA) second-team All-Midwest Region performer, had a career season for the Blazers in 2006. He led the team in goals (14), assists (7) and points (35) on the campaign. The 14 goals tied for fourth-most in a season in school history, while his 35 points were fifth-best in UAB lore. Furthermore, the first team all-conference honoree, closed his career with 34 goals and 84 points during his career, ranking second on the school's all-time list.

Monteiro was selected 8th in the 2007 MLS SuperDraft by the Chicago Fire in the first round. He played in 5 games (1 start) (154 minutes) for the Fire, scoring his first MLS goal against D.C. United on June 16, 2007 at RFK Stadium. He also appeared in 3 Reserve Division games for the Fire (2 starts), totaling 235 minutes.

Monteiro was traded to D.C. United on September 14, 2007 in exchange for a conditional 2008 MLS SuperDraft pick.

References

External links
 JersonMonteiro.com

1985 births
Living people
Angolan expatriate sportspeople in the United States
Angolan footballers
UAB Blazers men's soccer players
Atlanta Silverbacks players
USL First Division players
Chicago Fire FC players
D.C. United players
Footballers from Luanda
Major League Soccer players
Chicago Fire FC draft picks
Angolan expatriate footballers
Association football forwards
Soccer players from Houston